FK Avei Agstafa was an Azerbaijani football club from Ağstafa founded in 1990, and dissolved in 1993.

They participated in the Azerbaijan Top Division twice, finishing 13th and then 17th. Məqsəd Yaqubəliyev and Vüqar Qurbanov were the club's top goalscorers on 10 goals.

League and domestic cup history

References 

Avei Agstafa
Association football clubs established in 1990
Defunct football clubs in Azerbaijan
Association football clubs disestablished in 1993
1990 establishments in Azerbaijan
1990s disestablishments in Azerbaijan